Maiduan (also Maidun, Pujunan) is a small endangered language family of northeastern California.

Family division

The Maiduan consists of 4 languages:

 Maidu † (also known as Maidu proper, Northeastern Maidu, Mountain Maidu)
 Chico † (also known as Valley Maidu)
 Konkow (also known as Northwestern Maidu)
 Nisenan † (also known as Southern Maidu)

The languages have similar sound systems but differ significantly in terms of grammar. They are not mutually intelligible, even though many works often refer to all of the speakers of these languages as Maidu. The Chico dialects are little known due to scanty documentation, so their precise genetic relationship to the other languages probably cannot be determined (Mithun 1999), and in any case may have been not a fourth Maiduan language, but widely divergent dialects of Konkow (Ultan 1967).

Three of the languages went extinct by approximately the year 2000. Konkow was reported to have 3 elderly speakers in 2007.

Genetic relations

Maiduan is often considered in various Penutian phylum proposals. It was one of the original members of California Penutian (the Penutian "core").

See also

 Maidu

References

Bibliography
 Callaghan, Catherine A. (1997). "Evidence for Yok-Utian", International Journal of American Linguistics, Vol. 63, No. 1 (Jan., 1997), pp. 18–64.  
 Heizer, Robert F. (1966). Languages, territories, and names of California Indian tribes. University of California Press.
 Mithun, Marianne. (1999). The languages of Native North America. Cambridge: Cambridge University Press.  (hbk); .
 Shipley, William. (1961). "Maidu and Nisenan: A Binary Survey", International Journal of American Linguistics, Vol. 27, No. 1 (Jan., 1961), pp. 46–51.  
 Ultan, Russell. (1964). "Proto-Maidun phonology," International Journal of American Linguistics, Vol. 30, No. 4 (Oct., 1964) pp. 355-370.  
 Ultan, Russell. (1967). "Konkow Grammar," unpublished doctoral dissertation, University of California at Berkeley

External links 

 Maidu, An Illustrative Sketch
 Maidu Bibliography

 
Language
 
Indigenous languages of California
Penutian languages
Language families